Turtle Creek Township is a township in Todd County, Minnesota, United States. The population was 323 at the 2000 census.

Turtle Creek Township was organized in 1890.

Geography
According to the United States Census Bureau, the township has a total area of 35.7 square miles (92.5 km); 32.7 square miles (84.7 km) is land and 3.0 square miles (7.8 km) (8.48%) is water.

Demographics
As of the census of 2000, there were 323 people, 127 households, and 98 families residing in the township.  The population density was 9.9 people per square mile (3.8/km).  There were 255 housing units at an average density of 7.8/sq mi (3.0/km).  The racial makeup of the township was 96.28% White, 0.62% Native American, 0.31% Asian, and 2.79% from two or more races.

There were 127 households, out of which 30.7% had children under the age of 18 living with them, 72.4% were married couples living together, 1.6% had a female householder with no husband present, and 22.8% were non-families. 19.7% of all households were made up of individuals, and 9.4% had someone living alone who was 65 years of age or older.  The average household size was 2.54 and the average family size was 2.94.

In the township the population was spread out, with 25.1% under the age of 18, 6.2% from 18 to 24, 23.2% from 25 to 44, 25.4% from 45 to 64, and 20.1% who were 65 years of age or older.  The median age was 43 years. For every 100 females, there were 116.8 males.  For every 100 females age 18 and over, there were 112.3 males.

The median income for a household in the township was $31,750, and the median income for a family was $36,458. Males had a median income of $30,313 versus $21,094 for females. The per capita income for the township was $16,896.  About 13.4% of families and 16.0% of the population were below the poverty line, including 20.5% of those under age 18 and 25.0% of those age 65 or over.

References

Townships in Todd County, Minnesota
Townships in Minnesota